Saint-Leu may refer to:

France 
Saint-Leu, Réunion, Réunion department
Saint-Leu-d'Esserent, Oise department
Saint-Leu-la-Forêt, Val-d'Oise department
Huby-Saint-Leu, Pas-de-Calais department
Villers-sous-Saint-Leu, Oise department